The Campionat per Equips de Raspall (Valencian for Team Raspall Championship) is the Valencian pilota Raspall modality league played by professional pilotaris.

Statistics

References

See also
 Valencian pilota
 Raspall

1984 establishments in Spain
Valencian pilota competitions
Valencian pilota professional leagues